Bihar Combined Entrance Competitive Examination Board (BCECEB) conducts competitive examinations and counsellings every year for admissions in various courses of Medical, Engineering and Agricultural streams in the Institutions of Bihar. It is constituted under Bihar Acts, 1995. Office of the board is situated in IAS Association Building, Patna.

Admission Counsellings

UGEAC 
Under Graduate Engineering Admission Counselling (UGEAC) is conducted for admission to the first year B. Tech. Courses in Government Engineering Colleges of Bihar and Exalt College of Engineering & Technology, Vaishali, Bihar.

Counselling is based on the merit-list (Rank-List) of JEE Main conducted by the National Testing Agency (NTA).

UGMAC 
Under Graduate Medical Admission Counselling (UGMAC) is conducted for admission to the First year of the different Degree (MBBS, BDS, BAMS, BHMS, BUMS, B.V.Sc. & A.H.) courses in Government & Private Medical & Dental Colleges of Bihar state and Bihar Veterinary Colleges.

Counselling is based on the rank list of NEET (UG) conducted by the National Testing Agency.

PGEAC 
Post Graduate Engineering Admission Counselling (PGEAC) is conducted for admission to the first year of the Post Graduate Engineering in following courses: Counselling is based on merit list prepared from the GATE score or B.Tech. score.

PGMAC 
Post Graduate Medical Admission Counselling (PGMAC) is conducted for admission to first year of Post Graduate Degree & Diploma courses in Government & Private Medical & Dental Colleges of Bihar state.

Examinations

BCECE 
Bihar Combined Entrance Competitive Examination (BCECE) is conducted for the admission in Pharmacy, Medical and Agriculture stream of Institutions recognized by Government of Bihar.

 Pharmacy Stream : Admission in the course B.Pharm.
 Medical Stream : Admission in Graduation courses (Lab. Tech., OT Assistant, X-Ray Tech., Ophthalmic Assistant and Orthotics & Prosthetics) of B. Physiotherapy / B. Occupational Therapy / Para Medical
 Agriculture Stream : Admission in the course B.Sc. (Agriculture) and B.Sc. (Horticulture) of Bihar Agricultural University.

BCECE (LE) 
Bihar Combined Entrance Competitive Examination [Lateral Entry] is conducted to lateral entry in second year of the Undergraduate Engineering, Para Medical and Pharmacy degrees of various government & private Engineering, Para Medical and Pharmacy colleges of Bihar state respectively. It is for the candidates who have passed three years 'Engineering Diploma', two years 'Para Medical' or two years 'Pharmacy Diploma' course.

DCECE 
Diploma Certificate Entrance Competitive Examination (DCECE) is conducted for the admission in the following course groups:

 Polytechnic Engineering Course Group (PE) : Engineering Diploma Courses of government or private Polytechnic institutions under Bihar state.
 Part-Time Four Years Polytechnic Engineering Course Group (PPE):  Part-Time Four Years Polytechnic Engineering Diploma Course in New Government Polytechnic, Patna-13 under Bihar state.
 Para Medical (Intermediate Level) Course Group (PM) : Para Medical Course of various government or private Hospitals or Institutions of Bihar state.
 Para Medical-Dental (Secondary Level) Course Group (PMD) : Para Medical-Dental Course of various Hospitals or Institutions of Bihar state.

DECE (LE) 
Diploma Entrance Competitive Examination [Lateral Entry] is conducted for lateral entry to second year of various courses of Engineering Diploma level in various Polytechnic Institutes of Bihar.

ITICAT 
Industrial Training Institute Competitive Admission Test (ITICAT) is conducted for admission in various courses of all government Industrial Training Institutes (ITIs) of Bihar state.

See also 
 Joint Entrance Examination – Main
 National Eligibility cum Entrance Test (Undergraduate)

References

External links

JEE Main website
NEET (UG) website

Educational organisations based in India
State agencies of Bihar
Government Departments of Bihar
Qualifications awarding bodies
School examinations in India
1995 establishments in Bihar